Luis Fernández Teijeiro (born 27 September 1993) is a Spanish professional footballer who plays as a forward for Polish club Wisła Kraków.

Club career
Born in Burela, Province of Lugo, Fernández was a youth product of neighbouring Deportivo de La Coruña. He made his debut as a senior with the reserves, representing them in the Tercera División and scoring 21 goals in the 2012–13 season.

Fernández made his official debut for the Galicians' first team on 17 August 2013, starting in a 1–0 away win over UD Las Palmas in the Segunda División. He scored his first goal in the competition on 3 November, his team's last in the 2–0 home victory against Real Madrid Castilla.

Fernández appeared in 28 matches and scored five goals in 2013–14, as Depor returned to La Liga at the first attempt. On 18 July 2014, he was loaned to neighbouring second-division club CD Lugo in a season-long deal; still owned by the former, he joined SD Huesca of the same league the following campaign.

On 21 July 2016, Fernández terminated his contract with Deportivo and signed a two-year deal with AD Alcorcón just hours later. On 10 January of the following year, after being rarely used, he cut ties with the latter and moved to the second tier with UCAM Murcia CF the following day.

After suffering a knee injury, Fernández returned to Deportivo B on 1 September 2017 as a free agent. He re-joined UCAM the following 31 July, now on a permanent basis. 

On 3 July 2019, Fernández signed a two-year contract with Super League Greece club Asteras Tripolis F.C. for an undisclosed fee. On 7 June 2020, he netted through a free kick in the 2–1 away defeat of Athlitiki Enosi Larissa F.C. in the opening game of the playoffs, after an 80-day enforced COVID-19 break.

Fernández continued competing abroad the following seasons, with Khor Fakkan Club in the UAE Pro League and Wisła Kraków in the Polish Ekstraklasa.

References

External links

1993 births
Living people
People from A Mariña Central
Sportspeople from the Province of Lugo
Spanish footballers
Footballers from Galicia (Spain)
Association football forwards
Segunda División players
Segunda División B players
Tercera División players
Deportivo Fabril players
Deportivo de La Coruña players
CD Lugo players
SD Huesca footballers
AD Alcorcón footballers
UCAM Murcia CF players
Super League Greece players
Asteras Tripolis F.C. players
UAE Pro League players
Khor Fakkan Sports Club players
Ekstraklasa players
I liga players
Wisła Kraków players
Spanish expatriate footballers
Expatriate footballers in Greece
Expatriate footballers in the United Arab Emirates
Expatriate footballers in Poland
Spanish expatriate sportspeople in Greece
Spanish expatriate sportspeople in the United Arab Emirates
Spanish expatriate sportspeople in Poland